The 2014 California Insurance Commissioner election was held on November 4, 2014, to elect the Insurance Commissioner of California. Incumbent Democratic Commissioner Dave Jones ran for re-election to a second term in office.

A primary election was held on June 3, 2014. Under California's nonpartisan blanket primary law, all candidates appear on the same ballot, regardless of party. In the primary, voters may vote for any candidate, regardless of their party affiliation. The top two finishers — regardless of party — advance to the general election in November, even if a candidate manages to receive a majority of the votes cast in the primary election. Washington is the only other state with this system, a so-called "top two primary" (Louisiana has a similar "jungle primary"). Jones and Republican Ted Gaines finished first and second, respectively, and contested the general election, which Jones won.

Primary election

Candidates

Democratic Party

Declared
 Dave Jones, incumbent Insurance Commissioner

Republican Party

Declared
 Ted Gaines, state senator

Withdrew
 Michael Villines, former Minority Leader of the California State Assembly and nominee for Insurance Commissioner in 2010

Peace and Freedom Party

Declared
 Nathalie Hrizi, teacher and nominee for California's 12th congressional district in 2008

Results

General election

Polling

Results

References

External links

Insurance Commissioner
California Insurance Commissioner elections
California